The name of Estonia has a long and complex history. It has been connected to Aesti, first mentioned by Tacitus around AD 98. The name's modern geographical meaning comes from Eistland, Estia and Hestia in the medieval Scandinavian sources. Estonians adopted it as an endonym only in the mid-19th century.

Etymology

Origins
The name has a complex history extending over two thousand years, and there is little consensus on which places and peoples it has referred to at different periods. Roman historian Tacitus in his Germania (ca. AD 98), mentioned Aestiorum gentes "Aestian tribes", and some historians believe that he was directly referring to Balts while others have proposed that the name applied to the whole Eastern Baltic. The word Aesti mentioned by Tacitus might derive from Latin Aestuarii meaning "Estuary Dwellers". Later geographically vague mentions include Aesti by Jordanes from the 6th century and Aisti by Einhard from the early 7th century. The last mention generally considered to be applying primarily to the southern parts of the Eastern-Baltic is Eastlanda in a description of Wulfstan’s travels from the 9th century. In the following centuries, views of the Eastern Baltic became more complex, and in the 11th century, Adam of Bremen mentions three islands, with Aestland being the northernmost. 

The Viking runestones and Scandinavian sagas referring to Eistland were the earliest sources to use the name in its modern meaning. The sagas were composed in the 13th century on the basis of earlier oral tradition by historians like Snorri Sturluson. Estonia appears as Aistland in Gutasaga and as Eistland in Ynglinga saga, Óláfs saga Tryggvasonar, Haralds saga hárfagra, and Örvar-Odds saga. In Sweden, the Frugården runestone from the 11th century mentions Estlatum "Estonian lands". Many other runestones in Sweden indicate that at the time there were close contacts with Estonia, because of the frequent references therein to personal names such as Æistfari ("traveller to Estonia"), Æistulfr ("Wolf of Estonians") and Æistr ("Estonian"). The toponym Estland/Eistland has been connected to Old Scandinavian eist, austr ("the east"), forming part of Austrvegr, or even sometimes identical with it.

The first mostly reliable chronicle data comes from Gesta Danorum by the 12th century historian Saxo Grammaticus, referring to Estonia as Hestia, Estia and its people as Estonum. The 12th century Arab geographer al-Idrisi from Sicily, who presumably had help of some informant at Jutland in Denmark, describes Astalānda, probably referring to Estonia and the Livonian regions of Latvia. From Scandinavian the name spread to German and later, following the rise of the Catholic Church, reached Latin, with Henry of Latvia in his Heinrici Cronicon Lyvoniae (ca. AD 1229) naming the region Estonia and its inhabitants Estones.

Adoption by Estonians

The endonym maarahvas, literally meaning "land people" or "country folk", was used up until the mid-19th century. Its origins are unclear; there is a hypothesis of it originating from the prehistoric period, but no supporting evidence has been found. Another proposed explanation relates to its being a medieval loan-translation from German Landvolk. Although the name had been used earlier, Johann Voldemar Jannsen played a major role in popularisation of Eesti rahvas "Estonian people" among the Estonians themselves, during the Estonian national awakening. The first issue of his newspaper Perno Postimees in 1857 started with "Terre, armas Eesti rahwas!" meaning "Hello, dear Estonian people!".

In other languages
Esthonia was a common alternative English spelling. In 1922, in response to a letter by Estonian diplomat Oskar Kallas raising the issue, the Royal Geographical Society agreed that the correct spelling was Estonia. Formal adoption took place at the government level only in 1926, with the United Kingdom and United States then adopting the spelling Estonia. In the same year this spelling was officially endorsed by the Estonian government, alongside Estonie in French, and Estland in German, Danish, Dutch, Norwegian, and Swedish.

In Finnish Estonia is known as Viro, originating from the historic independent county Virumaa. In a similar vein, the corresponding Latvian word Igaunija derives from Ugandi County.

References

Bibliography

History of Estonia
Estonia